Hell Comes to Your Heart is an EP released by Mondo Generator on April 10, 2011. It contains 4 songs serving as an upcoming teaser for the full length LP of the same name.

Track listing
 "Dead Silence"
 "This Isn't Love"
 "The Way I Let You Down"
 "Smashed Apart"

Personnel
Nick Oliveri - Bass & Vocals
Hoss Wright - Drums & Percussion
Christopher Henry - Guitars
Ian Flannon Taylor - Guitars
Guitar Performances by Marc Diamond & Michael Hateley
Additional Vocals "This Isn't Love" by Michele Madden
Produced, Recorded & Mixed by Bradley Cook
Lyrics by Nick Oliveri, Music by Oliveri & Hoss
Natural Light Music BMI & Ultra Hoss Vibe Music ASCAP

References

Mondo Generator albums
2011 EPs